William John 'Spuds' Cox (June 12, 1904 – June 3, 1996) was an American middle-distance runner. Although initially qualifying for the 5,000m team at the 1924 Olympics, he competed in the 3,000m team race. He placed eighth individually, thereby winning a team bronze medal, together with Edward Kirby and Willard Tibbetts.

Cox was educated at the Rochester Shop School, Mercersburg Academy, and Pennsylvania State University. While at Mercersburg he put on several pounds in weight due to his love of potatoes in the school dining room, earning him the nickname 'Spuds'. In later years he returned to Rochester Shop School (then known as Edison Technical School) and taught mathematics for 36 years. Scots American coach Jimmy Curran trained him at Mercersburg.

See also
List of Pennsylvania State University Olympians

References

1904 births
1996 deaths
American male long-distance runners
Olympic bronze medalists for the United States in track and field
Athletes (track and field) at the 1924 Summer Olympics
Place of birth missing
Sportspeople from Rochester, New York
Medalists at the 1924 Summer Olympics